Negative freeroll occurs in poker when a player places an all-in wager on a hand that can only either tie or lose. A negative freeroll is relatively common in low stakes amateur play, but in higher stakes play, it is considered a serious blunder to  allow a negative freeroll on the final round of betting due to the amount of risk involved. 

Negative freeroll usually occurs in no-limit or pot-limit when contemplating an all-in wager, where the player acting first checks in a situation where they would be forced to call an opponent's final bet (due to pot odds and the strength of their holding).  If the opponent has a stronger hand, the opponent will most likely bet and the player will call and lose all their money regardless.  However, if the opponent has a weaker hand, betting may be the only way to get the opponent's money into the pot, as checking allows the opponent the opportunity to check in turn.

It can also refer to a situation where one is faced with a bet and is considering raising instead of calling. If the betting player has a polarized range indicating that he is either betting with the nuts or is bluffing, raising with a made hand is a negative freeroll, since the expected value of calling and raising are identical when the betting player has a bluff, but the expected value of a raise is worse than a call when the bettor has the nuts.

Hypothetical examples 

In a game of no-limit Texas hold'em, in heads up play on the river with an $8000 pot, both players have $2000 remaining behind.  The board is 5♠ 6♠ 9♣ 9♠ Q♣.  If the player acting first holds 6♦ 9♦ they must bet to avoid negative freeroll even though they are losing to an opponent holding 7♠ 8♠, a pair of Queens, or the 9♥ with a Queen. In this case the higher holdings will almost certainly bet and the player will be compelled to call due to pot odds and hand strength, while lesser holdings such as a lesser full house, a flush, or a straight that would have called the bet may simply check to see the hand down. Furthermore, with only $2000 remaining to bet in an $8000 pot, checking to induce a bluff is unlikely to succeed against competent opponents.

A second example in no-limit Texas hold'em: The board is 5♠ 6♠ 7♣ 8♦ 2♣ and the first player bets.  Assume that this player will only bet any 9 (a 9-high straight) or 9-T (a Ten-high straight) for value, and otherwise is bluffing. Raising his bet with any 9 (a nine-high straight) is a negative freeroll because the betting player has no hands that lose to a 9-high straight with which to call. The bettor either folds (in which case you win the same as if you had called), calls with a 9 (you split the pot, which is the same as if you had just called), or calls with 9-T (you lose more than if you had just called). Raising with a 9 would only have merit as a bluff if you believed this player capable of folding any hand but 9-T.

Notes

Further reading 
Harrington, Dan; Robertie, Bill (2006). Harrington on Hold'em: Expert Strategy for No-Limit Tournaments; Volume III: The Workbook.  Two Plus Two Publishing, pp. 41–56. .

Poker gameplay and terminology